This is a list of Persepolis F.C.'s results at the  2006/2007 Season. The club is competing in the Iran Pro League.

Squad

Iran Pro League

Persepolis schedule IPL 2006/07

Results by round

Results summary

League standings

Persepolis goalscorers in IPL 2006/07

Hazfi Cup 2006-07

Fourth Round (1/16 Final - Last 32) 
25 December 2006
 Sanati Kaveh 2-4 Persepolis
Ehsan Khorsandi 12' 73', Salah Hassan 69', Mehrzad Madanchi 76'

Fifth Round (1/8 Final - Last 16) 
13 February 2007
 Persepolis 2-0 Moghavemat Basij
Alireza Nikbakht 16', Ehsan Khorsandi 90+2'

1/4 Final - Last 8 
8 March 2007
 Bargh Tehran 2-2 (a.e.t.) Persepolis (Persepolis progress 3-5 on penalties)
Ziyad Chaboo 33', Alireza Nikbakht 93'

Semi-final 
1 June 2007
 Persepolis 1-4 (a.e.t.) Sepahan
Farzad Ashoubi 60'

Club

Kit 

|
|
|

Club managers

Club officials

References
 Persepolis FC official website
Persian League

Persepolis F.C. seasons
Persepolis